Burnt by the Sun was an American band from New Jersey. Formed in November 1999 by ex-Human-Remains-drummer Dave Witte and guitarist John Adubato. ex-For the Love of... vocalist Mike Olender and bassist Ted Patterson joined soon after. A split EP with The Luddite Clone on Ferret Records brought them to the attention of metal-specialized Relapse Records. Impressed by the band's inventive, often humorous take on the metalcore genre, Relapse quickly signed the band, releasing a self-titled EP. Their full-length debut, Soundtrack to the Personal Revolution (featuring second guitarist Chris Rascio), was released on January 22, 2002, followed by The Perfect Is The Enemy Of The Good which was released on October 7, 2003.

Witte and Olender opted to part ways with the group in 2004, leading to a lengthy search for suitable replacements. However, in 2006, both returned to a revamped group (now featuring Nick Hale, formerly of Premonitions of War, on 2nd guitar).
 
On August 25, 2009, Burnt by the Sun released Heart of Darkness.  The band stated that Heart of Darkness is the band's final album.

In 2016, former members Mike Olender, John Adubato, and Dave Witte started a new band called River Black.

Final lineup
Mike Olender- vocals (1999-2004, 2007-2011)
John Adubato - guitar (1999-2011)
Nick Hale - guitar (2007-2011)
Dave Witte - drums (1999-2004, 2007-2011)
Ted Patterson - bass (1999-2011)

Discography
 Burnt by the Sun / Luddite Clone Split (2000, Ferret Records)
 Burnt by the Sun (2001, Relapse Records)
 Soundtrack to the Personal Revolution (2002, Relapse Records)
 The Perfect Is the Enemy of the Good (2003, Relapse Records)
 Burnt By The Sun / Burst Split (2003, Relapse Records)
 Live from the Relapse Contamination Festival (2004, Relapse Records)
 Burnt by the Sun/Car Bomb Split (2007, Relapse Records)
 Heart of Darkness (2009, Relapse Records)

Appearances
 ''Black on Black: A Tribute to Black Flag, cover "Drinking and Driving"

External links
Myspace page
Interview with Dave Witte March 2006

Heavy metal musical groups from New Jersey
Metalcore musical groups from New Jersey
Political music groups
Relapse Records artists
Musical groups established in 1999
Ferret Music artists
1999 establishments in New Jersey